Kalo Chorio (Greek: Καλό Χωριό Λεμεσού, literally Good Village) is a village located  north of Limassol in Cyprus. It is best known for its production of Commandaria wine. The name translates (from Greek) word for word as good village.

References

Communities in Limassol District